Campitello (Campitellu) is located on the island of Corsica in the Mediterranean sea. 

Campitello is a commune in the Haute-Corse department of France on the island of Corsica. Campitellu is a village located in A Custera.  It is divided in 3 hamlets called : Progliolu, Bagnolu and Panicale.

Population

See also
Communes of the Haute-Corse department

References

Communes of Haute-Corse
Haute-Corse communes articles needing translation from French Wikipedia